Astroboa nuda is a type of basket star from Gorgonocephalidae family.

Its large arms (up to  armspread) are highly branched. It inhabits reef slopes exposed to current in diverse places such as the Red Sea and New Caledonia. During the day it coils into a tight ball. At night it spreads arms to form a basket to feed on plankton.
  They are part of the class Ophiuroidea, which is the largest class of echinoderms. The name Ophiuroidea comes from the roots, ophis, meaning snake and oura, which means tail, referring to the thin, spiraling shape of the basket stars’ arms.

Characteristics 
The arms of basket stars are divided into five sections, with many smaller arms branching off of these sections. The arms can range throughout a variety of lengths both within and among individuals of Astroboa nuda. Shorter arms help the basket stars attach themselves to a substrate, and may also help carry food from the longer arms, which catch prey, to the mouth. A. nuda are usually dark violet, black, or dark brown in color, but can occasionally be pale yellow. Typically, the yellow A. nuda tend to be larger. However, these differences in color and size have not been shown to cause differences in behavior. A. nuda also serves as a host to large copepod populations. These copepods live in the stomach of the basket stars.

Feeding and Diet 
Astroboa nuda is a filter feeder and usually feeds on plankton, along with larvae of decapods and copepods, as well as fish embryos. They may also occasionally obtain food from the surface of the substrate which they attach to. Typically, due to their light sensitivity, A. nuda hide in nearby shelters during the day, but branch out at night to feed. They feed from approximately two hours after sunset, to about one hour before sunrise. They usually return to the same spot every night, and are active during all seasons of the year. In addition, they try to place themselves near calm, barely touched waters. If the water in the area is heavily disturbed one night, they will usually stay sheltered behind coral heads, or other sections of the reef.

Predators 
Basket stars generally have very few predators, as they are low in nutritional value, but are preyed upon by some fish. Basket stars are often also caught by humans as part of by-catch during commercial fishing. They may break off part or all of their arm in order to escape, but these arms will regenerate.

Habitat 
A. nuda live in a variety of habitats, but are commonly found on the seafloor or at depths greater than twenty meters, burrowing into the sandy bottom. They are also found buried in mud, or within the holes of rocks or coral in tropical waters in areas such as Madagascar, Indonesia and Indo-Pacific regions, and occasionally in submarine canyons. Unlike some other species within Ophiuroidea that group together to form large clusters, Astroboa nuda are usually found alone or in groups of two to four.

Body Systems 
In terms of the structure of A. nuda, they have no anus or intestines, and the mouth is found on the underside of the body. In addition, they have a simple digestive system consisting of an esophagus, along with a sac-like stomach. The waste product of basket stars comes in the form of ammonia, and is removed from the body through diffusion. The class Ophiuroidea usually reproduces sexually, although asexual reproduction by fission can occur as well. Typically, there are separate male and female basket stars, which release sperm and eggs into the water. The sperm and eggs then join, and the larvae develop in the water. This process is known as broadcast spawning.

Studies and Research 
Not much research has been done regarding Astroboa nuda and basket stars in general. However, during one study, A. nuda were found to be very light sensitive. For this study, a high power electric torch was used to observe the basket stars, but once the torch was pointed directly towards the individuals, the arms began to coil inwards, with the thinner arms folding first and the entire organism eventually hiding, due to the resemblance between the light from the torch and daylight. When the discovery of basket stars and brittle stars began in the 18th century, the rate of research on these organisms reached its peak, however this rate leveled out and eventually lowered as time went on, with very little research being conducted currently. Furthermore, when looking at the fossil record, not much evidence has been found regarding the origin of basket stars, but some evidence shows they first began as brittle stars and diverged from there.

References

Gorgonocephalidae
Animals described in 1874